Dean Cochran (born March 18, 1969), is an American film actor.

Cochran was born in New Orleans, Louisiana. A graduate of Tulane University, he began his acting career in college, earning his Screen Actors Guild card in the film Blue Sky, for which Jessica Lange won an Oscar. While at Tulane, Cochran competed in and won an international acting competition where he was discovered by talent manager Al Onorato. 

Cochran has performed the lead roles in a number of plays written by William Shakespeare, including Macbeth, Henry V, Hamlet, The Two Gentlemen of Verona, as well as A Streetcar Named Desire, Cat on a Hot Tin Roof, and Burn This.

After moving to Los Angeles, Cochran guest starred in various network television series roles. In 2007 Cochran began a recurring role in the soap opera The Bold and the Beautiful as Detective Troy Scott, and in 2008 landed one of the starring roles in Meet the Spartans where he spoofs Rocky Balboa and Rambo.

He is married to former Miss USA Brandi Sherwood.

Filmography
 The Outside Woman (1989)
 False Witness (1989)
 This Gun for Hire (1991)
 The Gambler Returns: The Luck of the Draw (1991)
 Amityville: It's About Time (1992)
 Blue Sky (1994)
 A Dangerous Place (1995)
 Batman & Robin (1997)
 The Woman Every Man Wants (2001)
 The Cheater (2001)
 Until Morning (2002)
 Phone Booth (2002)
 Air Marshal (2003)
 Shark Zone (2003)
 Target of Opportunity (2004)
 The Cutter (2005)
 Just My Luck (2006)
 Protected! (2006)
 Cats on a Plane (2006)
 Acts of Violence (2008)
 Meet the Spartans (2008)

External links
Cochran's Website

1969 births
Tulane University alumni
American male film actors
American male television actors
Living people
Male actors from New Orleans